Macy Glacier is a  long and  crescent-shaped glacier on the southern slopes of the Tangra Mountains, Livingston Island in the South Shetland Islands, Antarctica.  The glacier is bounded by Friesland Ridge to the northwest, Levski Ridge to the northeast and Peshev Ridge to the southeast, and flows southwestwards into the head of Brunow Bay.

The feature was named by the UK Antarctic Place-names Committee in 1958 for Robert Macy, Master of the brig Aurora, one of the fleet of American sealers from New York which visited the South Shetland Islands in 1820–21.

Location

See also
 List of glaciers in the Antarctic
 Glaciology

Maps
 L.L. Ivanov et al. Antarctica: Livingston Island and Greenwich Island, South Shetland Islands. Scale 1:100000 topographic map. Sofia: Antarctic Place-names Commission of Bulgaria, 2005.
 L.L. Ivanov. Antarctica: Livingston Island and Greenwich, Robert, Snow and Smith Islands. Scale 1:120000 topographic map.  Troyan: Manfred Wörner Foundation, 2009.

References

External links
 SCAR Composite Antarctic Gazetteer.

Glaciers of Livingston Island